The Newkirk Plaza station is an express station on the BMT Brighton Line of the New York City Subway in Flatbush, Brooklyn. It is located on an open-cut at the center of the pedestrian-only Newkirk Plaza shopping mall, which is bounded by Newkirk Avenue on the north, Foster Avenue on the south, Marlborough Road to the west, and East 16th Street to the east. The station is served by the Q train at all times and by the B train on weekdays only.

History 

The station opened around  1900 as a two-track surface station named South Midwood, a reference to its location at the southern end of the former Town of Flatbush, which was also historically known as Midwood. Currently, Midwood is considered to be the area south of where the station now stands, so it would now more correctly be described as being in South Flatbush or North Midwood. The station was located along the Brooklyn, Flatbush and Coney Island Railroad line to Brighton Beach, which was built in 1878.

In 1903, a reconstruction project began to remove grade crossings along the line as part of the "Brighton Beach Improvement," which also rebuilt stations of the Brighton Beach Line and electrified the line due to increased ridership on the line. When on the surface, the station was a division point at which short turned elevated trains of the Fulton Street El terminated. After grade crossings on the line were fully eliminated in 1908, the station became a through stop for all services; at this time it was given the name Newkirk Avenue. On the eastern side of the station entrance building there is a plaque, which reads: "The Depression and Elevation of this railroad to abolish grade crossings was authorized by the Legislature May 9th, 1903. A joint undertaking between the City Of New York and the Brooklyn Heights R.R. Co. under the direction of the Brooklyn Grade Crossing Commission. .....  Work commenced August 1st 1904 - Completed July 1st 1908." This plaque refers to the aforementioned grade crossing project.

In 1981, the Metropolitan Transportation Authority listed the station among the 69 most deteriorated stations in the subway system. Starting in the late 1980s or early 1990s, business owners in the adjoining shopping area began advocating for the station to be renamed after the mall. The station and mall underwent reconstruction from 2009 to 2011. This included installation of yellow warning strips on the platform edges and repainting of the columns from red to green. The renovation cost $30 million. As part of the renovation of the station, it was renamed Newkirk Plaza in August 2011.

Station layout 
This open-cut station has four tracks and two island platforms, typical for a New York City Subway express station. Two pairs of I-beam columns run along the lengths of both platforms.

Newkirk Plaza mall 
Directly above the station is the Newkirk Plaza shopping area, which is located on either side of a pedestrian walkway above the station. The mall opened in 1913, shortly after the current station did. The shopping area is of an open-air format and all the stores face a passageway that is owned and maintained by the New York City Department of Transportation; however, the stores are privately owned. Many of the stores there are small family-owned businesses, lending the area a "small-town feel." Since the late 2000s, there have been efforts to create a business improvement district for the shopping area.

The Manhattan-bound local track is completely underneath the east side of the mall while the Coney Island-bound one is underneath the west side of the mall except for a section at the north end. The express tracks are in open view except in the center (where the station's only entrance is) and at either ends (where the Newkirk and Foster Avenues overpasses are).

Exit
The station's only entrance and exit is a station house at the center of the plaza. It has a token booth, turnstile bank, and a staircase leading to a short landing above both platforms that separate into two staircases facing the opposite directions going down to the platforms themselves. The station house was renovated in 1988, which included installation of white tiles and a stained-glass artwork titled Transit Skylight by David Wilson. The station house is located on Newkirk Avenue's south side between East 15th and East 16th Streets.

In popular culture 
This station appeared in the Futurama episode "The Luck of the Fryrish" and was portrayed as being in Fry's old neighborhood of Ditmas Park, considering his old home is a detached albeit run-down Victorian house. It also appeared in the films Next Stop, Greenwich Village, and Man Push Cart.

Gallery

References

External links 
 
 
 Station Reporter — B Train
 Station Reporter — Q Train
 MTA's Arts For Transit — Newkirk Plaza (BMT Brighton Line)
 The Subway Nut — Newkirk Plaza Pictures
 Unofficial webpage from newkirkplaza.net
 Globe lamps on Newkirk Avenue from Google Maps Street View
 Globe lamps on Foster Avenue from Google Maps Street View
 Entrance from Google Maps Street View
 Platforms from Google Maps Street View

BMT Brighton Line stations
New York City Subway stations in Brooklyn
Railway stations in the United States opened in 1878
Railway stations in the United States opened in 1907
1878 establishments in New York (state)
Flatbush, Brooklyn
1907 establishments in New York City